Frederick de Houtman ( – 21 October 1627) was a Dutch explorer, navigator, and colonial governor who sailed on the first Dutch expedition to the East Indies from 1595 until 1597, during which time he made observations of the southern celestial hemisphere and contributed to the creation of 12 new southern constellations.

Career

East Indies 
De Houtman was born in Gouda. De Houtman assisted fellow Dutch navigator Pieter Dirkszoon Keyser with astronomical observations during the first Dutch expedition to the East Indies from 1595 until 1597. In 1598, de Houtman sailed on a second expedition led by his brother, Cornelis de Houtman, who was killed during the voyage. Frederick was imprisoned by the Sultan of Aceh, Alauddin Riayat Syah, in northern Sumatra.

He used his two years of captivity—from September 1599 until August 1601—to study the local Malay language and to make astronomical observations. These observations supplemented those made by Keyser on the first expedition. The constellations formed from their observations were first published in 1597 or 1598 on a globe by Petrus Plancius, and later globes incorporated adjustments based on De Houtman's later observations.

Credit for these constellations is generally assigned jointly to Keyser, De Houtman, and Plancius, though some of the underlying stars were known beforehand. The constellations are also widely associated with Johann Bayer, who included them in his celestial atlas, Uranometria, in 1603. After De Houtman's return to Europe, De Houtman published his stellar observations in an appendix to his dictionary and grammar of the Malayan and Malagasy languages.

Australia 
They sighted the Australian coast near present-day Perth, which they called Dedelsland. After sailing northwards along the coast he encountered and only narrowly avoided a group of shoals, subsequently called the Houtman Abrolhos.

De Houtman then made landfall in the region known as Eendrachtsland, which the explorer Dirk Hartog had encountered earlier. In his journal, De Houtman identified these coasts as Locach, mentioned by Marco Polo to have been a country far south of China and indicated as such on maps by cartographers Plancius and Linschoten.

See also 
 John Davis – English explorer who accompanied De Houtman on the first East Indies' expedition as its pilot

References

Footnotes

Bibliography 

English

Dutch

External links 

  
 Frederick de Houtman’s catalogue

16th-century Dutch explorers
16th-century Dutch cartographers
17th-century Dutch cartographers
17th-century Dutch colonial governors
17th-century Dutch explorers
1570s births
1627 deaths
Cartography in the Dutch Republic
Dutch celestial cartography in the Age of Discovery
Dutch East India Company people
H
Explorers of Western Australia
People from Gouda, South Holland
Sailors on ships of the Dutch East India Company
Year of birth uncertain